Cuphophyllus pratensis is a species of agaric (gilled mushroom) in the family Hygrophoraceae. It has been given the recommended English name of meadow waxcap in the UK and in North America has variously been called the meadow waxy cap, salmon waxy cap, and butter meadowcap. The species has a widespread, mainly temperate distribution, occurring in grassland in Europe and in woodland elsewhere. The basidiocarps (fruit bodies) are edible and are occasionally collected and sold commercially.

Taxonomy
The species was first described in 1774 by the German mycologist and naturalist Jacob Christian Schäffer as Agaricus pratensis. It was subsequently combined in a number of different genera, before being transferred to Hygrocybe in 1914. The specific epithet comes from Latin "pratensis" (= growing in meadows). Molecular research, based on cladistic analysis of DNA sequences, has found that Hygrocybe pratensis does not belong in Hygrocybe sensu stricto but to the genus Cuphophyllus.

Description
Basidiocarps are agaricoid, up to 150 mm (6 in) tall, the cap convex at first, becoming flat, umbonate, or slightly depressed when expanded, up to 125 mm (5 in) across. The cap surface is smooth and dry, pale salmon to orange-buff. The lamellae (gills) are waxy, pale, and decurrent (widely attached to and running down the stipe). The stipe (stem) is smooth, cylindrical or tapering to the base, and creamy in colour. The spore print is white, the spores (under a microscope) smooth, inamyloid, ellipsoid, about 5.5 to 6.5 by 4.0 to 5.0 μm.

Similar species
Cuphophyllus berkeleyi is very similar, but fruit bodies are white (it has sometimes been considered a variety of C. pratensis). Hygrophorus nemoreus is also similar, but is an ectomycorrhizal species, growing in woodland with oaks, and has a distinctly mealy smell.

Distribution and habitat
The meadow waxcap has a widespread distribution, mainly occurring in temperate zones. It has been recorded in Europe, North Africa, North and South America, northern Asia, Australia, and New Zealand. Like other waxcaps, it grows in old, unimproved, short-sward grassland (pastures and lawns) in Europe, but in woodland elsewhere. Recent research suggests waxcaps are neither mycorrhizal nor saprotrophic but may be associated with mosses.

Conservation
In Europe, Cuphophyllus pratensis is typical of waxcap grasslands, a declining habitat due to changing agricultural practices. Though the species is one of the commoner members of the genus, it nonetheless appears on the official or provisional national red lists of threatened fungi in a few European countries, including the Czech Republic, Germany (Bavaria), and Poland.

Edibility
Fruit bodies of the meadow waxcap are edible and in some countries are seasonally collected for commercial sale in local markets.

References

Edible fungi
Fungi of Asia
Fungi of Australia
Fungi of Europe
Fungi of North America
Taxa named by Jacob Christian Schäffer
Hygrophoraceae
Fungi described in 1774
Fungi of New Zealand
Fungi of South America